The discography of Wizkid, a Nigerian Afrobeats singer, consists of five studio albums, one EP, fifty-three singles (including thirty-nine as a featured artist), forty-four promotional singles, sixteen guest appearances, six cameo appearances and thirty-three music videos. Wizkid started his music career at age 11, releasing a seven-track collaborative album with Glorious Five entitled Lil Prinz. Wizkid garnered notoriety when he collaborated with Naeto C, Ikechukwu, M.I and Kel. He signed a record deal with Empire Mates Entertainment in 2009. From 2009 through 2011, Wizkid worked on materials for his debut album Superstar (2011). Superstar was supported by the singles "Love My Baby", "Pakurumo", "Tease Me/Bad Guys", "Don't Dull" and "Holla at Your Boy".

Wizkid was one of the lead artists on the compilation album Empire Mates State of Mind, which was released to the public through the music platform Spinlet. The album features EME acts as well as guest appearances from XO Senavoe, Rotimi and Basketmouth. His second studio album, Ayo, was released on 17 September 2014. In 2017 he released his third studio album, Sounds from the Other Side, which brought Wizkid's first entry into the major international charts, including the Billboard 200 and UK Albums Chart. On 30 October 2020 he published his fourth studio album, Made in Lagos, which received critical acclaim, confirming the international chart success of the previous project. Made in Lagos contains the single "Essence", which became the first Nigerian song to chart on the Billboard Hot 100.

Wizkid's 2016 collaboration with Canadian hip-hop artist Drake on his international hit, "One Dance", reached number one in 15 countries, including the United States, United Kingdom, Canada and Australia, thereby becoming his most commercially successful single to date. Between 2019 and 2020, Wizkid was featured in Beyoncé's projects The Lion King: The Gift and its relative visual project Black Is King, and won a Grammy Award with the collaboration "Brown Skin Girl".

Wizkid has collaborated with international and domestic acts such as Bracket, Angel, Lynxxx, Iyanya, Wande Coal, Ice Prince, R2Bees, Wale, Young Jeezy, Akon, Uhuru, Drake, Tyga and Femi Kuti, among others.

Albums

Studio albums

Singles

As lead artist

As featured artist

Promotional singles

As lead artist

As featured artist

Other charted songs

Guest appearances

Cameo appearances

Covers and freestyles

Music videos

Notes

References 

Discographies of Nigerian artists